is a city in Osaka Prefecture, Japan. , the city had an estimated population of 158,465 in 26128 households and a population density of 4900 persons per km².

Geography
Ōsakasayama is located in the southeastern part of Osaka Prefecture. Sayama pond, which is said to be the oldest dam-type reservoir in Japan, is located in the center of the city and is a symbol of the city.

Neighboring municipalities
Osaka Prefecture
Sakai
Tondabayashi
Kawachinagano

Climate
Ōsakasayama has a Humid subtropical climate (Köppen Cfa) characterized by warm summers and cool winters with light to no snowfall.  The average annual temperature in Ōsakasayama is 14.6 °C. The average annual rainfall is 1475 mm with September as the wettest month. The temperatures are highest on average in August, at around 26.6 °C, and lowest in January, at around 3.2 °C.

Demographics
Per Japanese census data, the population of Ōsakasayama has increased form the 1960s through 1990s and has now leveled off.

History
The area of the modern city of Ōsakasayama was within ancient Kawachi Province. From 1600 to the Meiji restoration it was the seat of the Later Hōjō clan, rulers of Sayama Domain under the Tokugawa shogunate. The area became part of Osaka Prefecture from 1881. The villages of Sayama was created with the establishment of the modern municipalities system on April 1, 1889. On April 1, 1896 the area became part of Minamikawachi District, Osaka. Sayama was elevated to town status on April 1, 1951. On October 1, 1987, Sayama was raised to city status. To avoid confusion with the city of Sayama in Saitama Prefecture, the name was changed to Ōsakasayama.

Government
Ōsakasayama has a mayor-council form of government with a directly elected mayor and a unicameral city council of 15 members. Ōsakasayama, collectively with Tondabayashi and the smaller municipalities of Minamikawachi District contributes two members to the Osaka Prefectural Assembly. In terms of national politics, the city is part of Osaka 15th district of the lower house of the Diet of Japan.

Economy
Due to its location next to the large metropolis of Osaka City and Sakai, Sayama has developed into a commuter town with large New Town developments from the 1970s through 1990s, inlacing the large-scale Sayama New Town, in the southern part of the city. Traditionally, the area was known for growing grapes.

Education
Ōsakasayama has seven public elementary schools and three public middle schools operated by the city government and one public high school operated by the Osaka Prefectural Department of Education.  The medical school of Kindai University is located in Ōsakasayama.

Transportation

Railway
 Nankai Electric Railway -   Nankai Kōya Line
  -  -

Highway

Sister city relations
  - Ontario, Oregon, United States

Local attractions
Sayama pond, National Historic Site
 Prefectural Sayamaike Museum - The museum was designed by Tadao Ando

Notable people from Ōsakasayama
 Teppei Koike, Japanese actor, singer and member of the singer-songwriter duo WaT
 Yuki Kotani, Japanese football player (Roasso Kumamoto, J3 League/Cerezo Osaka, J1 League)
 Tomoka Nishiyama, Japanese apprentice shogi professional player ranked 3-dan
 Aki Takayama, Japanese former synchronised swimming athlete
 Tatsuhiro Tamura, Japanese professional baseball catcher (Chiba Lotte Marines, Nippon Professional Baseball – Pacific League)
 Kan Usuki, Japanese idol, comedian, musician, Pin Artist and drummer
 Yuki Muroya, Japanese women's professional shogi player ranked 3-dan
 Kenkichi Ueda, general in the Imperial Japanese Army

References

External links

  

Cities in Osaka Prefecture
Ōsakasayama